KLMN, UHF analog channel 26, was a Fox-affiliated television station licensed to Great Falls, Montana, United States. The station was owned by Equity Media Holdings.

History 
Founded on December 19, 2000, KLMN signed on in mid-2003 as a Fox affiliate, with additional programming from UPN. When Helena-based NBC affiliate KTVH bought a low-power repeater station in the Great Falls area in 2005, it caused an affiliation shake-up. Long-time NBC affiliate KTGF (now KJJC-TV) became an affiliate of Fox, leaving KLMN with only UPN programming. KLMN became a MyNetworkTV affiliate in September 2006. In May 2007, Fox programming abruptly returned to KLMN after nearly two years on KTGF, which might have been coincidental with KTGF's parent, Destiny Communications, entering a Joint Sales Agreement with KLMN.

The KLMN callsign was once used by what is now KFTA-TV in Fort Smith, Arkansas. Ironically, KLMN was not the only station in Great Falls whose callsign was once used in Arkansas, as its competitor KRTV carries the callsign of a now-defunct station in Little Rock, Equity Media Holdings' hometown.

In 2007, a Federal Communications Commission (FCC) inquiry was launched to determine whether Equity's control of KLMN violated the multiple ownership rules; a local competitor subsequently filed a petition to deny the station's license renewal application. Processing of other FCC license assignment and modification applications involving Equity had been delayed pending resolution of these issues.

Because it was granted an original construction permit after the FCC finalized the DTV allotment plan on April 21, 1997, the station did not receive a companion channel for a digital television station. Instead, at the end of the digital TV conversion period for full-service stations, KLMN would have had to turn off its analog signal and turn on its digital signal (called a "flash-cut"). However, according to the station's DTV status report, "On December 8, 2008, the licensee's parent corporation filed a petition for bankruptcy relief under Chapter 11 of the federal bankruptcy code... This station must obtain post-petition financing and court approval before digital facilities may be constructed. The station will cease analogue broadcasting on February 17, 2009, regardless of whether digital facilities are operational by that date. The station will file authority to remain silent if so required by the FCC."

While the DTV Delay Act extended this deadline to June 12, 2009, Equity applied for an extension of the digital construction permit in order to retain the broadcast license until the station could be sold. The company had also applied to operate at reduced power (50 kW).

At auction on April 16, 2009, Max Media bought the programming assets (but not the broadcasting facilities) of KLMN and the rest of Equity's Montana Fox station system. On July 13, Max Media established a new Fox affiliate on the digital subchannel of its ABC affiliate in Great Falls, KFBB; it was originally planned to launch on July 1. In the meantime, KLMN shut down as scheduled on June 12, 2009 and Equity fully returned the licenses of KLMN and the company's other Fox affiliated Montana stations to the FCC, who then deleted the licenses and their corresponding call signs.

During the interim period between the shutdown of KLMN and the launch of the KFBB subchannel, Fox programming was available only through the local cable system, Bresnan Communications, by arrangement with Equity.

References

Equity Media Holdings
Television channels and stations established in 2003
2003 establishments in Montana
Television channels and stations disestablished in 2009
2009 disestablishments in Montana
LMN
Defunct television stations in the United States
LMN